Don Chow Tacos was a Chinese-Mexican fusion food truck based in Los Angeles, California. A veteran in the food truck industry, Don Chow was founded on April 22, 2009, by Dominic Lau and Lawrence Lie. Their motto, “Where Chino meets Latino," represents the pair's Chinese heritage, (represented by the truck's logo, a depiction of the traditional Chinese guardian lion), and the Hispanic influences that had been constant in their lives as they grew up in LA.  Don Chow Tacos ceased operations on February 16, 2015.

History 
Don Chow Tacos was founded in October 2009. The idea for the truck was conceived when owners Lau and Lie identified a foodie niche in the late-night bar-goer crowd. When they decided launch Don Chow Tacos, the food truck industry was in its early stages. The name they chose to represent their fusion tacos, Don Chow, was derived from the honorific Spanish title "Don" in combination with the popular Chinese surname "Chow", (which also became a play-on-words for being synonymous with "food").

Don Chow began as a two-man operation, with Lau and Lie cooking and serving bar crowds on Thursday and Friday nights, as well as anyone else who encountered the truck on weekends. They appeared regularly at Zanzibar in Santa Monica and Townhouse in Venice. Both kept their day jobs, working after regular business hours to get Don Chow up and running.

When the truck transitioned to a full-week schedule in October 2009, Ernie Gallegos was hired to manage a cook to take over for Lau and Lie. With Gallegos’ guidance, Don Chow was able to establish regular operations.  The food truck gained local popularity after Guy Fieri sampled Don Chow's fusion fare on Diners, Drive-Ins and Dives in 2010 and again in 2015. Earlier that year, Don Chow had been recognized on NBC's Food Truck Week on the truck's first birthday: April 22, 2010, and Dominic Lau was interviewed by Kurt Knutsson, "Cyberguy" for KTLA in May. As its popularity continued to grow, Don Chow was featured on a segment for National Taco Day on KTLA on October 4, 2010.

Don Chow Tacos and owner Lau were featured on the  Cooking Channel's show "Easy Chinese" hosted by Ching-He Huang in June 2012.  The episode focused on late night street food.  Lau prepared one of Don Chow's signature dishes, the Chinese BBQ Pork taco, while Huang prepared a spicy oyster omelet "Taco".

In July 2013, Don Chow Tacos' owner Dominic had the opportunity to participate on the Lifetime Network's reality competition show Supermarket Superstar. Lau won his episode (Episode 2 Category "Global Cuisine") with the Kung Pao Chicken Chimale and went on to be a finalist in the show's final episode.

Cuisine 

The Don Chow truck serves traditional Mexican food with Chinese flavors from Lau and Lie's family and friends’ recipes. The menu includes tacos, burritos, tortas, “Chimales,” and noodle dishes. Some of their most popular dishes are their Kung Pao Chicken Tacos, Chinese BBQ Pork Burritos, and “Chimales”, (traditional tamales stuffed with their own Chinese style meats). Other signature dishes are their Carne Asada Chow Fun and “Ultimate LA Tacos” – carne asada tacos topped with bacon – which were inspired by the bacon-wrapped hot dogs that pervade tailgating parties during the football season at USC, (both Lau and Lie's alma mater).

All food is prepared and cooked to order by the staff on the truck. Excepting their signature dishes, the menu remains flexible and rotates depending on its location. Additionally, the truck offers several secret off-menu items.

Events 
The mobility of the food truck has enabled Don Chow to cater to a variety of Californians and their lifestyles. The truck makes regular appearances at events such as the Los Angeles Outdoor Cinema Food Fest, the LA Street Food Fest, and farmers' markets. Balancing fun and profitability, Don Chow appears at a variety of catered events in addition to being on the streets. Past catered events have included the sets of the Food Network's Giada at Home and the film No Strings Attached.

Don Chow gives back to the community, participating in fundraisers and charity events for local schools and other causes. The truck has collaborated multiple times with Cal State LA to benefit their Urban Learning Program and participated in charity events for the 2009 Typhoon Ondoy in the Philippines and the 2010 Haiti earthquake. Don Chow also partnered with KTLA's news anchor Wendy Burch and the Good News Foundation to rebuild the Gilbert Lindsay Park in Los Angeles, providing free lunches for all volunteers on May 29, 2010.

Don Chow is regularly commissioned to appear at special events. On April 16, 2011, Don Chow Tacos catered Lacoste L!ve  at Coachella, which included celebrity guests including Katy Perry, Kirsten Dunst, Elijah Wood, and Ke$ha. Don Chow received especially positive reviews from indie rock band, The Strokes. Don Chow made an appearance at Cal State Northridge's "Big Show" on October 3, 2009, where performers included Far East Movement and Lupe Fiasco, as well as the following year on October 2, 2010, when the talent included LMFAO and Kevin Rudolf. In September 2010, Don Chow participated in the Los Angeles Times Celebration of Food and Wine.

Technology had been vital to the growth Don Chow experienced soon after its founding, and continues to attract a technologically savvy audience to the truck. The locations of Don Chow are updated daily on Twitter, as well as Facebook.

See also 

 Kogi Korean BBQ
 List of food trucks

References

External links 
 DonChowTacos.com
 Don Chow Tacos Facebook
 Don Chow Tacos Twitter

2009 establishments in California
American fusion cuisine
Chinese fusion cuisine
Chinese-American culture in California
Food trucks
Mexican fusion cuisine
Mexican-American culture in California
Restaurants established in 2009
Restaurants in Los Angeles